Maureen Ann Montagne (born July 10, 1993) is a Filipino-American beauty pageant titleholder who was crowned Binibining Pilipinas Globe 2021. She represented the Philippines at The Miss Globe 2021 pageant and won.

Previously, she was crowned Miss Arizona USA 2015 and finished as a Top 15 semifinalist at the Miss USA 2015 pageant. She was also previously crowned Miss Eco Philippines 2018 at the Miss World Philippines 2018 competition and finished 1st Runner-Up at the Miss Eco International 2019 pageant.

Personal life
Maureen Ann Montagne was born and raised in Chandler, Arizona. She is of Filipino and French descent. She went back to the Philippines to compete on various national pageants.

Pageantry

Mutya ng Pilipinas 2013
Maureen competed for her first Philippine national pageant in Mutya ng Pilipinas 2013. She finished as the first runner-up.

Miss Arizona USA 2015
Montagne competed at Miss Arizona USA where she represented Tempe, Arizona. She won the crown giving her right to compete in Miss USA 2015.

Miss USA 2015
After winning the Miss Arizona USA 2015 title, she competed at Miss USA 2015 where she placed at Top 15.

Miss World America 2017
Maureen joined the Miss World America 2017 where she placed 1st runner-up to Clarissa Bowers of Florida.

Miss World Philippines 2018
Montagne tried her luck in the Miss World Philippines 2018 pageant where she was crowned as Miss Eco Philippines 2018.

Miss Eco International 2019
After winning Miss Eco Philippines 2018, Montagne represented the Philippines in the Miss Eco International 2019 pageant held in Cairo, Egypt. She finished as first runner-up to Miss Peru's Suheyn Cipriani who was later dethroned due to pregnancy. As the first runner-up, she was automatically qualified to wear the crown but she refused it due to her commitments with Binibining Pilipinas.

Binibining Pilipinas 2021
Montagne joined the Binibining Pilipinas 2021 where she was crowned as Binibining Pilipinas Globe 2021, giving her the right to compete at The Miss Globe 2021 pageant.

The Miss Globe 2021
Montagne represented the Philippines in The Miss Globe 2021 pageant in Tirana, Albania and won.

References

External links

1993 births
Living people
American beauty pageant winners
People from Chandler, Arizona
American people of Filipino descent
American people of French descent
Filipino people of American descent
Filipino people of French descent
Mutya ng Pilipinas winners
Miss USA 2015 delegates
Miss World Philippines winners
Binibining Pilipinas winners
People from Batangas